Pancham may refer to:

 Pancham da, nickname of Rahul Dev Burman, an Indian film score composer
 One of the seven basic swaras (notes) of the musical scale of Indian classical music
 Pancham (TV series), an Indian TV series
 Pancham (Pokémon), a Pokémon
 Panchama, the 5th svara from the 7 svaras of Hindustani music and Carnatic music.